Mail Order Bride is a 1984 Australian television film about a builder who imports a Filipino bride.

References

External links
 
 Mail Order Bride at Oz Movies

Australian television films
1984 films
Films about interracial romance
Films about weddings
1980s English-language films